Nathaniel Quentin Moran (born September 23, 1974) is an American politician and attorney who has served as the U.S. representative for Texas's 1st congressional district since 2023. A member of the Republican Party, he previously served as a member of the Tyler, Texas city council from the 5th district and as the county judge of Smith County, Texas.

Early life and education
Nathaniel Quentin Moran was born as a twin on September 23, 1974, to Marjorie McCall and Dale E. Moran. His parents moved to Smith County, Texas, to create a bible college. His father later served on the city council and as mayor of Whitehouse, Texas. He traveled to Russia as a part of the People to People International 1992. He graduated from Whitehouse High School in 1993.

Moran attended West Point for two years and graduated from Texas Tech University with a bachelor of arts degree in Russian, a Master of Business Administration, and Juris Doctor. He worked as a teaching assistant in the Lubbock Independent School District. He married Kyna, with whom he had four children.

Local politics
Moran was a member of the College Republicans, served as a precinct chair in the Republican Party, and attended county and state conventions as a delegate.

On February 17, 2005, Moran filed to run for the Tyler, Texas, city council from the 5th district. The incumbent, Ron Shaffer, was term-limited. He defeated Von Johnson after raising $2,439 and spending $3,209. He announced his reelection campaign on February 8, 2007, and faced no opposition. He served until 2009, when he resigned as his family moved to Houston for his son to attend a special school following the loss of his hearing.

Joel Baker, the Smith County Judge, was suspended in June 2016, after being indicted on three counts of violating the Texas Open Meetings Act. On July 19, the Smith County Commissioners Court voted unanimously to replace Baker with Moran, who was sworn in as the acting county judge on July 22. Baker resigned on November 4. Moran defeated Democratic nominee Michael Mast in the 2018 election. He was a member of the Smith County Election Commission. Moran resigned on November 9, 2022, after his election to Congress, and Neal Franklin was selected to replace him.

U.S. House of Representatives

Elections

2022

Representative Louie Gohmert announced that he would run for the Republican nomination for Texas Attorney General instead of reelection in Texas's 1st congressional district. On December 2, 2021, Moran announced his campaign to succeed Gohmert. He won the Republican nomination and defeated Democratic nominee Jrmar Jefferson.

Caucus memberships
 Republican Main Street Partnership

Electoral history

References

Works cited

External links

Nathaniel Moran for Congress campaign website

|-

1974 births
County judges in Texas
Living people
Republican Party members of the United States House of Representatives from Texas
Texas Republicans
Texas Tech University alumni